The following is a list of episodes for the American television sitcom Caroline in the City, which ran from September 21, 1995, to April 26, 1999, on NBC.

Series overview

Episodes

Season 1 (1995–96)

Season 2 (1996–97)

Season 3 (1997–98)

Season 4 (1998–99)

External links
 List of episodes at imdb.com

Lists of American sitcom episodes